In mathematics, in the area of abstract algebra known as Galois theory, the Galois group of a certain type of field extension is a specific group associated with the field extension. The study of field extensions and their relationship to the polynomials that give rise to them via Galois groups is called Galois theory, so named in honor of Évariste Galois who first discovered them.

For a more elementary discussion of Galois groups in terms of permutation groups, see the article on Galois theory.

Definition
The set of all automorphisms of  forms a group with the operation of function composition. This group is sometimes denoted by 

Galois group of a polynomial 
Another definition of the Galois group comes from the Galois group of a polynomial . If there is a field  such that  factors as a product of linear polynomials

over the field , then the Galois group of the polynomial  is defined as the Galois group of  where  is minimal among all such fields.

Structure of Galois groups

Fundamental theorem of Galois theory 
One of the important structure theorems from Galois theory comes from the fundamental theorem of Galois theory.

Moreover, if  is a normal subgroup then .

Lattice structure 

Inducting 
As a corollary, this can be inducted finitely many times. Given Galois extensions  where  then there is an isomorphism of the corresponding Galois groups:

Examples
The notation  indicates the field extension obtained by adjoining an element  to the field .

Computational tools

Cardinality of the Galois group and the degree of the field extension 
One of the basic propositions required for completely determining the Galois groups of a finite field extension is the following: Given a polynomial , let  be its splitting field extension. Then the order of the Galois group is equal to the degree of the field extension; that is,

Eisenstein's criterion 
A useful tool for determining the Galois group of a polynomial comes from Eisenstein's criterion. If a polynomial  factors into irreducible polynomials  the Galois group of  can be determined using the Galois groups of each  since the Galois group of  contains each of the Galois groups of the

Trivial group 
 is the trivial group that has a single element, namely the identity automorphism.

Another example of a Galois group which is trivial is  Indeed, it can be shown that any automorphism of  must preserve the ordering of the real numbers and hence must be the identity.

Consider the field  The group  contains only the identity automorphism.

 and 

are missing from the extension—in other words  is not a splitting field.

Finite abelian groups 
The Galois group  has two elements, the identity automorphism and the complex conjugation automorphism.

Quadratic extensions 
This example generalizes for a prime number

Product of quadratic extensions 

Cyclotomic extensions 
Another useful class of examples comes from the splitting fields of cyclotomic polynomials. These are polynomials  defined as

Since the degree of the field is equal to the degree of the polynomial, these automorphisms generate the Galois group. If  then

If  is a prime , then a corollary of this is 

In fact, any finite abelian group can be found as the Galois group of some subfield of a cyclotomic field extension by the Kronecker–Weber theorem.

Finite fields 
Another useful class of examples of Galois groups with finite abelian groups comes from finite fields. If  is a prime power, and if  and  denote the Galois fields of order  and  respectively, then  is cyclic of order  and generated by the Frobenius homomorphism.

Degree 4 examples 
The field extension  is an example of a degree  field extension. This has two automorphisms  where  and  Since these two generators define a group of order , the Klein four-group, they determine the entire Galois group.

Another example is given from the splitting field  of the polynomial

generating a group of order .

Finite non-abelian groups 
Consider now  where  is a primitive cube root of unity.

Quaternion group 
For example, the field extension

has the prescribed Galois group.

Symmetric group of prime order 

For example,  is irreducible from Eisenstein's criterion.

Comparing Galois groups of field extensions of global fields 
Diagrammatically, this meanswhere the vertical arrows are isomorphisms. This gives a technique for constructing Galois groups of local fields using global Galois groups.

Infinite groups 
For example, the field extensions  for a square-free element  each have a unique degree  automorphism, inducing an automorphism in 

One of the most studied classes of infinite Galois group is the absolute Galois group, which is an infinite, profinite group defined as the inverse limit of all finite Galois extensions  for a fixed field. The inverse limit is denoted

,

where  is the separable closure of the field . Note this group is a topological group. Some basic examples include  and

. 

Another readily computable example comes from the field extension  containing the square root of every positive prime. It has Galois group

,

which can be deduced from the profinite limit

and using the computation of the Galois groups.

Properties
The significance of an extension being Galois is that it obeys the fundamental theorem of Galois theory: the closed (with respect to the Krull topology) subgroups of the Galois group correspond to the intermediate fields of the field extension.

If  is a Galois extension, then  can be given a topology, called the Krull topology, that makes it into a profinite group.

See also
Fundamental theorem of Galois theory
Absolute Galois group
Galois representation
Demushkin group
Solvable group

Notes

References

External links

Galois group and the Quaternion group

Comparing the global and local galois groups of an extension of number fields
Galois Representations - Richard Taylor

Galois theory